The Nagreongo Solar Power Station, also Nagréongo Solar Power Station, is a  solar power  in Burkina Faso. The solar farm, which was commissioned in July 2022, was developed by the French IPP, GreenYellow, a subsidiary of the Casino Group. The energy generated here is sold to the Burkinabe electricity utility company SONABEL, (Société Nationale d'électricité du Burkina Faso) (English: National Electricity Company of Burkina Faso), under a 25-year power purchase agreement (PPA).

Location

Overview
Burkina Faso's generation capacity is reported as 357 megawatts, as of October 2021. This power station is expected to add 30 megawatts, equivalent to 50 GWh of green renewable energy, also avoiding the emission of 27,500 tons of carbon dioxide equivalent annually.

The development involved the installation of 70,000 photo voltaic solar panels, together with transformers and inverters. Other infrastructure developments include maintenance buildings, a control room, offices and an electric switchyard. The power station achieved commercial commissioning on 7 July 2022.

Developers
The power station was developed by a consortium led by GreenYellow, a French IPP and subsidiary of the Casino Group, in partnership with a group of financiers and donors referred to as the Africa Energy Coopération (AEC). The developer/owners of the power station formed a special purpose adhoc vehicle company to own and operate the solar farm. The SPV is called Société de production d’énergie solaire de Ouagadougou SAS (SPES Ouagadougou). A 25-year power purchase agreement was executed between SPES Ouagadougou and SONABEL.

Funding
The construction costs are reported as US$30 million. The table below, outlines the funding sources for this renewable energy project. The Multilateral Investment Guarantee Agency, a member of the World Bank Group provided risk insurance  for the owner/developers, for the first 20 years of the power plant's operation at a price of US$4.5 million.

See also

List of power stations in Burkina Faso

References

External links
 Approximate Location of Nagréongo Solar Power Station
 Burkina Faso breaks ground on 30-MW solar project As of 3 November 2020.

Solar power stations in Burkina Faso
Plateau-Central Region
Oubritenga Province